Gantogtokh Gantuya (born 14 May 1998) is a Mongolian footballer who plays as a midfielder for Mongolian Premier League club Tuv Buganuud and the Mongolian national team.

Club career
In March 2022 Gantuya joined Tuv Buganuud from Ulaanbaatar City.

International career
Gantuya made two appearances for Mongolia in 2020 AFC U-23 Championship qualification. He made his senior international debut on 7 June 2021 in a 1–0 victory over Kyrgyzstan in 2022 FIFA World Cup qualification.

International statistics

References

External links

1998 births
Living people
Mongolian footballers
Association football midfielders
Mongolia international footballers
Ulaanbaatar City FC players
Tuv Buganuud FC players
Mongolian National Premier League players